Southern City Colleges is a private non-sectarian college in Zamboanga City. It was founded on December 8, 1946 by Francisco M. Caliolio, Sr. and his wife, Arecelie F. Caliolio. The institution is now managed by their grandchildren and is headed by Mr. Edwin M. Caliolio as its president. It was once established as Southern Academy in 1946, then renamed as Southern College of Commerce in 1952 and as Southern City Colleges in 1962.

It presently has three Campuses, namely the Central Campus, the West Campus (the former MEIN College) and the East Campus, all located in Zamboanga City.

Notable persons 
 Mr. Edwin Caliolio - was awarded with a Command Plaque, Academe Sector.
 Abdulmaid Muin - An alumnus to the college who is now the Philippine ambassador to East Timor.
 Ryan Roose B. "RR" Garcia - a PBA basketball player for TNT KaTropa, once played for the school's basketball team.
 Rudy B. Lingganay Jr. - a PBA basketball player for NLEX Road Warriors.
 Chico A. Lanete - a PBA basketball player for Phoenix Fuel Masters.

References 

Universities and colleges in the Philippines
Universities and colleges in Zamboanga City